Colonels Chair is a mountain located in Greene County, New York southwest of Hunter, New York. Located south is Hunter Mountain and to the west is Rusk Mountain. Colonels Chair drains north into Schoharie Creek via Taylor Hollow and Shanty Hollow.

References

Mountains of Greene County, New York
Mountains of New York (state)